Charlie Booth (1 October 1903 – 20 May 2008) was an Australian athlete.

Career 
In the 1930s, he was a champion runner who participated in several Stawell Gifts, until a victory in 1939. He was also a fitter and turner apprentice. Booth is widely credited for inventing starting blocks for sprinting races, along with his father.

When he first used his invention in a race, made from a T-bar and a block of wood cut in half, he was disqualified for life.  The decision was overturned a few weeks later.

At age 100, Booth gave a rare interview about his long and successful life.

In 2006, the then 102-year-old wanted to run in a special Stawell Gift over-40s race, with the prize being a pig, but in the end he decided against it.

Death 
In 2007, he celebrated his 104th birthday with a small private party. Nearly eight months later in May 2008, Booth died at the age of 104.

References

1903 births
2008 deaths
Australian centenarians
20th-century Australian inventors
Australian male sprinters
Australian masters athletes
Men centenarians